"Happy Life" is a song recorded by Japanese singers Mika Nakashima and Salyu. It was released as an exclusively digital single by Sony Music Associated Records on May 12, 2017. It was co-written by Takeshi Kobayashi and Yuko Ando and composed, arranged and produced by Kobayashi. The song was subsequently included as a B-side on the single "A or B". "Happy Life" was used in Tokyo Metro's televised commercial campaign Find My Tokyo, starring actress Satomi Ishihara.

Composition
Kobayashi wrote the song with an image in mind of a woman working in the urban area of Tokyo. Salyu was invited to be a featured artist on the song because Kobayashi wanted the song to represent friendship among women; he thought having two unique voices rather than one would better symbolize this theme. Yuko Ando also co-wrote the lyrics to "Happy Life", adding a third female creative voice to the mix.

Critical reception
"Happy Life" was praised for the "peaceful quality" of the song. CDJournal critics also praised the combination of Nakashima and Salyu's voices, describing it as a duet that leaves you "basking in the afterglow".

References

2017 songs
2017 singles
Mika Nakashima songs
Song recordings produced by Takeshi Kobayashi
Sony Music Associated Records singles
Songs written by Takeshi Kobayashi